Goli Jan or Golijan may refer to:
 Goli Jan, Ardabil
 Golijan, Fars
 Goli Jan, Mazandaran
 Goli Jan Rural District, in Mazandaran Province